Nakhtneith  was a Queen consort of ancient Egypt. She lived during the 1st Dynasty. Her name means "strong is (the goddess) Neith".

Biography 
Nakhtneith(Nḫt Nj.t) was the wife of Pharaoh Djer. She is known from a stela found in Abydos (stela 95) where she was buried near her husband. On the stela she holds the titles "Great one of the hetes scepter" (Wr.t-ḥts) and "she who carries Horus" (Rmn- Ḥr.(w)). The stela is currently in the Cairo Museum (JE 35005). It measures 31.6 cm high by 18.5 cm wide.

References 

31st-century BC women
Queens consort of the First Dynasty of Egypt
Djer